Tiger, My Friend is the first album by electronica band Psapp.  It was originally released on The Leaf Label and was later reissued by Domino Records, which now controls Psapp's entire catalog.

Reception
Gemma Padley in a review for BBC called it a "highly skillful album but not one for the masses", and said, "the unfussy quirky instrumentation and simple cylindrical melodic fragments create an intensity bubbling just below the surface. Every tiny fragment is carefully placed creating uniquely woven canvases".

Track listing

Personnel

Psapp

Carim Clasmann
Galia Durant

Additional personnel

Shawn Lee - drums, "Rear Moth"
Matt Wasser - beer can, "Tiger, My Friend"
Splodge the cat - squeaks, "About Fun"

Notes

Several of the tracks were originally available on EPs released earlier by the band:
"Curuncula" was on the Japanese Northdown mini album.
"Calm Down" was on Do Something Wrong.
"Velvet Pony" and "About Fun" were on Buttons and War.
"Leaving in Coffins" has been released under the titles "Electricity In Pine Boxes" and "Attention Tokyo."

References

External links
Psapp jumble shop (official)
Psapp official website
Tiger, My Friend at Domino Records
Psapp at Domino Records

2004 debut albums
Domino Recording Company albums
Psapp albums